Eragrostis australasica, commonly known as swamp canegrass, is a tussock grass, in the subfamily Chloridoideae of the family Poaceae, that is endemic to Australia. It is a tufted perennial with strongly branched, cane-like culms, that grows up to 2.4 m in height. It is typically found on periodically flooded land in arid and semi-arid regions.

References

australasica
Poales of Australia
Flora of New South Wales
Flora of the Northern Territory
Flora of Queensland
Flora of South Australia
Flora of Victoria (Australia)
Flora of Western Australia
Plants described in 1854